Don Cacas (10 July 1931 – 15 June 2012) was an Australian wrestler. He competed at the 1960 Summer Olympics and the 1964 Summer Olympics.

References

External links
 

1931 births
2012 deaths
Australian male sport wrestlers
Olympic wrestlers of Australia
Wrestlers at the 1960 Summer Olympics
Wrestlers at the 1964 Summer Olympics
Sportspeople from Adelaide